The School District of Reedsburg is a school district based in the city of Reedsburg, Wisconsin.

Covering approximately 264 square miles, the district serves the city of Reedsburg and the villages of Ironton, LaValle, Loganville, and Rock Springs. The district administers 4 elementary schools, one intermediate school, one middle school, and one high school. It has an enrollment of over 2,800 students, and a graduation rate of 94.3%. The district operates with a $32 million budget.

Schools

Secondary 

Reedsburg Area High School (RAHS)
Webb Middle School

Intermediate 

 Prairie Ridge Intermediate School

Elementary
 Ironton-LaValle Elementary School
 Loganville Elementary School
 Pineview Elementary School
 Westside Elementary School

Former schools 

 Rock Springs Elementary School
 Rock Springs Elementary School was closed in 2009, as a result of a failed referendum to provide more funding for the school. The school was damaged in the 2008 flooding of the Baraboo River.
 South School (South Elementary School)
 South School was originally built in 1937, serving grades kindergarten to 12. It served students from the east side of the Baraboo River in Reedsburg. The School District of Reedsburg made the decision to close the school after a 2017 referendum, and built a new elementary school on the east side of town. The school officially closed on June 11, 2019.

Grounds 
The School District of Reedsburg owns two forests in Sauk County: the Hartje Outdoor Learning Center and the Romoren School Forest. The District also oversees 129 acres of sports fields, lawn space, walking trails, and parking lots.

History

2017 referendum
Should the School District of Reedsburg be allowed to exceed $32,000,000 for the cost of a new elementary school, a new transportation facility, and building renovations for Reedsburg Area High School, Webb Middle School, Ironton-LaValle, Loganville, Pineview, and Westside Elementary School?

COVID-19 pandemic 
On 13 March 2020, Governor Tony Evers mandated the closure of all Wisconsin schools until 6 April. The school district followed the governor's order, and all schools were close immediately. Distance education was used for the remainder of the 2019–2020 school year, ending on 22 May, earlier than originally scheduled.

References

School districts in Wisconsin
Education in Sauk County, Wisconsin
School District